The Tiger in the Smoke is a crime novel by Margery Allingham, first published in 1952 in the United Kingdom by Chatto & Windus and in the United States by Doubleday. It is the fourteenth novel in the Albert Campion series.

Author J. K. Rowling revealed that it is her favourite crime novel.

Plot
Meg Elginbrodde, a young war widow whose husband was presumed killed during the D-Day landings, has been receiving mysterious photographs that suggest he is still alive. As a thick and overwhelming pea soup fog begins to descend upon London, she meets with Inspector Charle Luke and her cousin, the detective Albert Campion, at a train station to await the arrival of an individual who claims to know her husband's whereabouts. Meg appears to recognise a man disembarking from a train as her husband, but when apprehended the man is revealed to be a recently paroled convict called "Duds" Morrison who has somehow acquired an old, distinctive coat of Elginbrodde's. Duds is arrested but soon released without charge. 

Unknown to the others, Meg's new fiancee Geoffrey Levett, who is driven to jealousy by the uncertainty of knowing whether Elginbrodde is actually alive, accosts Duds after his release and tries to bribe him for information regarding Elginbrodde. Before he can learn anything, the two men are attacked by a gang of criminals disguised as a street band made up of beggars and impoverished veterans. The gang demand that Duds reveal the whereabouts of Duds's employer, a man they refer to only as "the Gaffer", who they claim has cheated them out of something valuable. When Duds tries to flee, the gang attack him, resulting in the gang leader, the albino Tiddy Doll, accidentally kicking him to death. The gang kidnap Geoffrey and, disguising him as a fellow beggar, hold him hostage.

Investigating how Duds acquired the coat, Meg's father Canon Avril discovers that a member of his household staff gave it to Mrs Lucy Cash, a local loan shark, to settle a debt. Levett's unusual disappearance begins to arouse suspicion that he is involved in the murder of Duds. However, during the investigation three people, including a young police detective, are brutally stabbed to death in a nearby house, triggering a public outcry. The murderer is quickly identified as Jack Havoc, a violent and mysterious convict who has recently escaped from jail. Learning that Havoc served with Elginbrodde during the war, it soon becomes clear to Campion and Luke that Havoc is "the Gaffer". Meg, accompanied by Campion's wife Amanda, goes to her and Levett's future home to destroy wartime letters she received from Elginbrodde in an attempt to find closure. However, while they are there Havoc breaks in and begins to ransack the house, clearly searching for something. Meg flees to seek help while Amanda stays to observe Havoc. Before Havoc can discover her, the house is stormed by the police, but Havoc manages a lucky escape.

While the gang are debating what to do with Geoffrey Levett, Havoc—their wartime sergeant—surprises them by entering their hideout. Although Havoc still holds a powerful thrall over the gang, Tiddy Doll realises that he actually needs the gang's help, having earned the wrath of both the police and the criminal underworld due to his reckless actions. Havoc reveals that, during a confidential mission in occupied France during the war, Elginbrodde revealed that the house the unit was infiltrating was his family home, and that a great treasure had been located there. In the event of his death, the treasure would be inherited by Meg. Elginbrodde had written a letter revealing the treasure's exact location, and the impersonation was an attempt to acquire it from her. The connections between himself and Elginbrodde have convinced Havoc of the existence of what he calls "the Science of Luck" and his all-consuming belief that he is destined to find the treasure has driven all his ruthless actions. 

Tiddy Doll, who is paranoid that Levett can identify him as the murderer of Duds, attempts to manipulate Havoc into revealing too much in front of Levett, which would give him reason to murder the other man. Before this can happen, however, Campion—following a hunch—comes across their hideout, forcing the gang to make a swift retreat and leave Geoffrey behind to be rescued. Using information provided by Havoc, Geoffrey locates the letter and decides to find the treasure to protect Meg's inheritance. Campion, Amanda and Meg agree to accompany him to Elginbrodde's childhood home in France to search for it.

After a conversation with Inspector Luke, who suspects a connection between Havoc and Mrs Cash, Canon Avril realises that Havoc's true identity is Johnny Cash, the son of Mrs Cash who had previously been thought dead. In fact, Mrs Cash had blackmailed Avril's now-deceased wife, who was in debt to her, to pretend to identify her son's body to help him avoid punishment for his crimes. Avril goes to confront Havoc, whom he realizes has been secretly hiding in the crypt of the local church. They are old acquaintances, if not friends, and during their confrontation, the two also have a philosophical conversation about Havoc's belief in the "Science of Luck", which shares some similarity to Avril's own philosophy of life. After accidentally revealing the location of the treasure, Avril tries to persuade Havoc to abandon his murderous path. Havoc attacks Avril in response—but the old priest's words have shaken his self-confidence, leading Havoc to untypically only wound Avril instead of murdering him. 

Driven to desperation, Havoc follows Campion and the others to France and the now-known location of the treasure, closely pursued by Inspector Luke. On arriving, Havoc narrowly escapes a violent ambush which sees the rest of the gang, including Tiddy Doll, killed or arrested. On reaching the statue where the treasure is hidden, Havoc encounters Meg, whom he used to bully when they were children. Alone, and not recognising her childhood acquaintance, Meg asks for his help in removing the treasure from the statue, which the two manage to accomplish. The treasure turns out to be a beautiful but monetarily worthless old ivory carving of a Madonna and Child. Meg, finally reaching closure with Elginbrodde's death, is moved to tears, but Havoc is horrified that all he has done has been for nothing. A broken man, he escapes the clutches of the police one more time, after which he commits suicide by plunging off a nearby cliff.

Film
The story was adapted for a 1956 film Tiger in the Smoke starring Donald Sinden, Muriel Pavlow and Tony Wright, but omitting the central character of Campion and handing his dialogue and scenes to other characters, particularly Inspector Luke, and changing the ending.

References 

 Margery Allingham, The Tiger in the Smoke (London: Chatto & Windus, 1952)
 Margery Allingham, The Tiger in the Smoke (Vintage, Random House, 2005)

External links 
 
An Allingham bibliography, with dates and publishers, from the UK Margery Allingham Society

1952 British novels
Novels by Margery Allingham
Novels set in London
Chatto & Windus books
British novels adapted into films